The Peoria Sports Complex is a baseball complex located in the Peoria suburb of Phoenix, Arizona, USA, near Peoria's main shopping district on Bell Road. It consists of the main baseball stadium (Peoria Stadium) and 12 practice fields. It is one of six facilities to host Arizona Fall League games. The capacity of Peoria Stadium is approximately 12,000.

During spring training, it is the home stadium of both the San Diego Padres and the Seattle Mariners, who play in the spring training Cactus League. Both teams are leased to hold spring training there until 2034.

The complex has been a site of the Vans Warped Tour every summer since 2002.

It is also hosts a number of other events, including youth baseball tournaments and city events, and is available as a potential wedding venue for couples.

References

External links

 

Cactus League venues
Minor league baseball venues
Arizona Fall League ballparks
Buildings and structures in Peoria, Arizona
San Diego Padres spring training venues
Seattle Mariners spring training venues
Baseball venues in Arizona
Sports venues in Maricopa County, Arizona
Sports in Peoria, Arizona
1994 establishments in Arizona
Sports venues completed in 1994
Soccer venues in Arizona
Arizona Complex League ballparks
Sports complexes in the United States